Acanthosquilla crosnieri is a species of stomatopod crustacean in the Nannosquillidae family.
It has been found in waters off the Marquesas, at depths of 0 - 100 m but more usually at 7 - 25 m, and was first described by the Australian carcinologist Shane T. Ahyong in 2002.

References

External links
Acanthosquilla crosnieri occurrence data

Stomatopoda
Taxa named by Shane T. Ahyong
Crustaceans described in 2002